William Davidson Williamson (born 29 September 1952) is a Scottish former professional footballer who played as a winger for Aberdeen, Dundee United and Dundee. Williamson played in two Scottish League Cup Finals, winning the trophy once.

Career 
Williamson was born in Dumfries. He scored 25 goals in what he played for Kirkconnel F.C. in the 1969–70 season.

Williamson joined Aberdeen in 1969. In 1975 he scored a hat-trick for Aberdeen in a 3–2 win against Celtic when playing at the time in midfield. He became only the second player at the time to score three or more goals in a single game playing for Aberdeen against Celtic, following in the footsteps of George Hamilton. Williamson picked up a winners medal from the 1976 Scottish League Cup Final 2–1 victory against Celtic. In his 92 league appearances he scored 19 goals.

In 1976 Williamson became only the second player to transfer directly from Aberdeen to Dundee United. His stay at Tannadice was short with his league appearances adding up to only 11 games in which he scored once. Williamson in 1977 became the fourth player to transfer directly from Dundee United to Dundee. In his 87 league appearances he scored 22 goals. Williamson was a member of the Dundee team which contested the 1980 Scottish League Cup final with Dundee United, losing 3–0.

Williamson then played for Brisbane Lions and North Star in Brisbane, Australia. He captained North Star to a 1988 XXXX League Grand Final win over Brisbane City before becoming North Star's coach.

Honours
Aberdeen
 Scottish League Cup: 1976–77

Dundee
 Scottish League Cup: finalist 1980–81

References

1952 births
Living people
Footballers from Dumfries
Scottish footballers
Association football wingers
Scottish Football League players
National Soccer League (Australia) players
Aberdeen F.C. players
Dundee United F.C. players
Dundee F.C. players
Scottish expatriate footballers
Scottish expatriate sportspeople in Australia
Expatriate soccer players in Australia